Fortunato is a 1942 Spanish comedy film directed by Fernando Delgado and starring Antonio Vico, Carmen Carbonell and Florencia Bécquer. It was made in the style of an Italian White Telephone film.

Cast
 Antonio Vico as Fortunato 
 Carmen Carbonell as Rosario 
 Florencia Bécquer as Amaranta 
 Anselmo Fernández as Victorio 
 Manuel San Román as Alberto 
 José Alburquerque as Maître 
 Esteban Lehoz as Tenor 
 María Luisa Arias as Constanza 
 Joaquina Carreras as Remedios 
 Pablo Hidalgo as Cabo de Comparsas 
 Mariano Alcón as Sabatino 
 Pedro Chicote as Glotter 
 Luisa Jerez as Inés
 Esmeralda de Seslavine as Tiple 
 Emilio Santiago 
 Antonio P. Soriano
Luis Alonso Murillo
 Pastora Peña

References

Bibliography 
 Bentley, Bernard. A Companion to Spanish Cinema. Boydell & Brewer 2008.

External links 
 

1942 comedy films
Spanish comedy films
1942 films
1940s Spanish-language films
Films directed by Fernando Delgado
Films scored by Jesús García Leoz
Spanish black-and-white films
1940s Spanish films